A poet is a person who writes poetry.

Poet or poets may also refer to:
 Poets (song), by The Tragically Hip
 "Poet", a song by Sly & the Family Stone from the album There's a Riot Goin' On
 Arnold "Poet" Jackson, a fictional character
 , a General G. O. Squier-class transport ship
 POET, an American biofuel company
 Ash-Shu'ara, the twenty-sixth sura of the Qur'an, usually translated as “The Poets”.
 Only the Poets London and Reading based indie band

Arts and entertainment
 Poet (2021 film), a Kazakh-language film by Darezhan Omirbaev

See also
 The Poet (disambiguation)